I Like to Hurt People is a 1985 wrestling documentary film directed by Donald G. Jackson.

Synopsis 
After aspirations to film a horror movie were dropped, a mockumentary cobbled together from ringside footage follows popular wrestlers of the eighties.

Cast 
 Abdullah the Butcher (as self)
 Andre the Giant (as self)
 Ox Baker (as self)
 Heather Feather

References

External links 
 

Wrestling films
American mockumentary films
1985 films
American sports comedy films
1980s American films